Gourette is a winter sports resort in the French Pyrenees. It is located in the commune of Eaux-Bonnes in the département of  Pyrénées-Atlantiques, on the D 918 road which passes through the Col d'Aubisque mountain pass.  The closest air access is Pau Pyrénées Airport.

Winter offerings

In winter, the resort offers one of the largest skiable areas in the Pyrenean chain with 30 marked trails, and extending between 1,400 and 2,400 metres in altitude, covering about 90 hectares of mostly north-facing slopes.  The area also hosts snowboarding and snowshoe trails. In 2005 the region spent over 50 million euros to improve its winter resort facilities, including trails, lifts, accommodation and other infrastructure.

Summer offerings
In summer, tourists visit the valley of the Gave d'Ossau and its lakes for sightseeing, hiking, biking, rock climbing, and mountaineering, including the ascent of Pic du Midi d'Ossau (2,884 metres/9,462 ft).  The French GR 10 hiking trail, which covers over 800 km from one end of the Pyrenees to the other, passes through the village.

Tour de France
The 2007 Tour de France passed through Gourette.  The road through the Col d'Aubisque pass, cresting at an altitude of 1,710 metres (5,610 feet), has slopes from 7.5 to 10% and is considered a Hors Catégorie climb in Union Cycliste Internationale race classifications.

External links 

Official website of the resort 
Mémoire du Cyclisme website 

Ski stations in France
Tourist attractions in Pyrénées-Atlantiques